Vestibulitis may refer to:

 Labyrinthitis, a problem of the inner ear
 Nasal vestibulitis, diffuse dermatitis of the nasal vestibule
 Vulvar vestibulitis, vulvodynia localized to the vestibule region